Sede may refer to:

People
 Gérard de Sède
 Marc Dion Sédé (born 1987), Ivorian football player

Places
 Sede, Ethiopia
 Sede, district of Santa Maria, Brazil

Other
 SEDE, the Subcommittee on Security and Defence of the European Parliament

See also
 Sde (disambiguation)
 SDE (disambiguation)